Cobubatha megaplaga is a moth in the family Noctuidae (the owlet moths). It was described by Harrison Gray Dyar Jr. in 1912 and is found in Central and North America.

The MONA or Hodges number for Cobubatha megaplaga is 9019.2.

References

 Crabo L, Davis M, Hammond P, Mustelin T, Shepard J (2013). "Five new species and three new subspecies of Erebidae and Noctuidae (Insecta, Lepidoptera) from Northwestern North America, with notes on Chytolita Grote (Erebidae) and Hydraecia Guenée (Noctuidae)". ZooKeys 264: 85-123.
 Lafontaine, J. Donald & Schmidt, B. Christian (2010). "Annotated check list of the Noctuoidea (Insecta, Lepidoptera) of North America north of Mexico". ZooKeys, vol. 40, 1–239.

Further reading

 Arnett, Ross H. (2000). American Insects: A Handbook of the Insects of America North of Mexico. CRC Press.

External links

 Butterflies and Moths of North America

Eustrotiinae